
Gmina Kiernozia is a rural gmina (administrative district) in Łowicz County, Łódź Voivodeship, in central Poland.

Villages
Gmina Kiernozia contains the villages and settlements of Brodne-Józefów, Brodne-Towarzystwo, Chruśle, Czerniew, Jadzień, Jerzewo, Kiernozia, Lasocin, Natolin Kiernoski, Niedzieliska, Osiny, Sokołów-Kolonia, Sokołów-Towarzystwo, Stępów, Teresew, Tydówka, Wiśniewo, Witusza, Wola Stępowska and Zamiary.

Neighbouring gminas
Gmina Kiernozia is bordered by the gminas of Chąśno, Iłów, Kocierzew Południowy, Pacyna, Sanniki, Zduny and Żychlin.

References
Polish official population figures 2006

Kiernozia
Łowicz County